The Mid-Atlantic Women's Hockey League (MAWHL) is the oldest continuously active women's ice hockey league in North America. The MAWHL is a senior amateur league under the oversight of USA Hockey. It is based in the United States and has three divisions allowing for different levels of play. The league has players with a wide array of experience, ranging from athletes who have competed at the high school level to those who have spent time on the United States women's national ice hockey team.

History
The MAWHL was begun in 1975–76 with only three teams. The Delaware Bobcats, the Boulevard Hookers and the University of Pennsylvania's club team. In the 1976–77 season, the Philadelphia Ice-Centennials joined the MAWHL.

During the summer of 1977, the increased popularity of ice hockey sparked the birth of the Mid-Atlantic Women's Ice Hockey League. It consisted of nine teams at the start of the 1977–78 season. The newcomers included: the Bergen Blades A team and B team, the Ironbound Bandits, the Pittsburgh Pennies, and the Philadelphia Ice-Centennials B team.

At the beginning of the 1978–79 season, the Budweiser Redcoats, and the Green Machine Eagles from Long Island, New York joined our league. Unfortunately the Pittsburgh Pennies, and the Bergen Blades B team dropped out. With these changes MAWHL now had a nine-team league divided into North and South regional divisions. At the start of the 1979–80 season our league started with eight teams: Four in the both divisions. At the start of the 1980–81 season, only six teams remained in the league. Gradually even that number diminished to four with the losses of the Bergen Blades in 1981, and the then Long Island Eagles in 1986

2014–15 Teams

Senior B Division (no longer part of MAWHL)

 Bergen Blades
 Boulevard Hookers
 Jersey City Recreational
 Long Island Eagles
 Long Island Hurricanes
 New Jersey Selects
 New York Raiders  (2007–2008 to Present)
 Old York Roadrunners
 Ironbound Bandits
 Philadelphia Freeze
 Philadelphia Ice Centennials
 Philadelphia Roadrunners
 Pittsburgh Pennies
 University of Penn

Senior C Division

 Baltimore Blizzard (2000–2001 to Present)
 Chesapeake Bay Lightning (1997–1998 to 2001–2002 and 2010 to Present)
 District Renegades (2016-2017 to Present)
 Philadelphia Voodoo (2013 to present)
 Rooftop Rebels  (2010 to Present)
 Washington Wolves (1997–1998 to Present)

Senior D Division

 Baltimore Blizzard (2000–2001 to Present)
 Chesapeake Bay Lightning (2010 to Present)
 Hagerstown Mayhem  (2013 to Present)
 Frederick Firestorm  (2002 to Present)
 Prince William Wildcats (2006–2007 to Present)
 Reading Reign (2010–2011 to Present)
 Washington Wolves (2000–2001 to Present)
 Pittsburgh Puffins (2014 to Present)

Former Teams
 American University Eagles  (2001–2002), in level Senior D Division.
 Bridgewater Wings  (2000–2001 to 2005–2006), in level Senior B Division.
 Central Penn Blades - 2 teams: (1999–2000 & 2004–2005), in level Senior C Division, (2000–2001 to 2003–2004 ) in level Senior D Division.
 Chesapeake Bay Lightning (2008–2009) in level Senior B Division.
 Columbia Panthers  (2006–2007) in level Senior D Division.
 Concord Flames  (1999–2000 to 2008–2009) in level Senior C Division
 Delaware Bobcats  - 3 teams: (1975–1976 to 2000–2001) in level Senior B Division, (1998–1999 to 2006–2007) in level Senior C Division, (2000–2001 to 2006–2007) in level Senior D Division.
 Delaware Phoenix  (2001–2002 to 2006–2007) in level Senior C division.
 Floyd Hall Arena Quarry Cats (1999–2000 and 2006–2007 to 2009–2010) in level Senior C Division.
 Harrisburg Rockettes (1997–1998) in level Senior C Division.
 Hollydell Hurricanes  - 2 teams (2002–2003 to 2004–2005) in level Senior B Division, (2002–2003 to 2004–2005) in level Senior C Division.
 Lehigh Valley Wicked (2005–2006) in level Senior C Division
 Philadelphia Freeze (1997–1998 to 2007–2008) in Level Senior C Division
 Prince William Wildcats  (2005–2006) in Level Senior C Division
 Quakers Hockey Club - 2 teams: (2005–2006) in level Senior B Division,( 2007–2008 to 2007–2008) in level Senior C Division.
 Queenston Hockey Club  (? to 2003–2004) in level Senior B Division.
 Reading Reign  (? to 2013/14) in level Senior C Division.
 Richmond Raptors  (2007–2008 to 2007–2008) in level Senior D Division.
 South Jersey Grizzlies  (1997–1998 to 2001–2002) in level Senior C Division.
 University of Maryland Terps - 2 teams: (1998–1999 to 2000–2001) in level Senior C & D Divisions.
 Washington Redcoats  (1976–1977 to 1993–1994) in level Senior B Division.
 Washington Wolves (1994–1995 to 2004–2005) in level Senior B Division

Championship

Senior B Division Champions

Senior C Division Champions

Senior D Division Champions

Scoring champions

Senior B Division Leading Scorer

Senior C Division Leading Scorer

Senior D Division Leading Scorer

MAWHL Staff 2010–11
 Commissioner - Stephanie Ciulla
 President - Trish Foote
 Vice President (division B) - Buena Guzman
 Vice President (division C) - Denise Webster
 Vice President (division D) - Lori Krist
 Treasurer - Kim Buchinsky
 Scheduler - Karen Lubberman
 Secretary - Erin Schaffer
 Statistician - Lisa Cervo
 Historian - Denise M. Manahl-Priest

References

External links
  Officiel web site of MAWHL
  Rules and regulations of MAWHL

2
Amateur ice hockey
Youth ice hockey